Evgeny Aydamirov (born 11 May 1987 in Leningrad) is a male hammer thrower from Russia. His personal best throw is 74.92 metres, achieved in March 2010 in Adler. He held the junior world record with 82.62 metres with the 6 kg until Javier Cienfuegos beat it with an 82.96 toss in 2009.

Achievements

References

1987 births
Living people
Russian male hammer throwers